Carolyn Lynne Steinseifer (born February 12, 1968), later known by her married name Carolyn Bates, is an American former competition swimmer and Olympic champion.  She won gold medals in the women's 100-meter freestyle, 4×100-meter freestyle relay and 4x100-meter medley relay at the 1984 Summer Olympics in Los Angeles.

As a 15-year-old at the 1983 Pan American Games in Caracas, Venezuela, she won gold medals in the 4×100-meter freestyle and 4×100-meter medley relays.  As a 17-year-old, she won gold medals in the 200-meter freestyle, 4×100-meter freestyle relay and the 4×200-meter relay, and a silver in the 100-meter freestyle at the 1985 Pan Pacific Swimming Championships in Tokyo, Japan.

Steinseifer attended the University of Texas, where she swam for coach Richard Quick's Texas Longhorns swimming and diving team in National Collegiate Athletic Association (NCAA) competition.  During her college career, she was a member of three of the Lady Longhorns' NCAA national championship relay teams—once in the 800-yard relay (1987) and twice in the 200-yard relay (1987, 1988).  She was also a key points contributor to the Longhorns' NCAA national team championships in 1987 and 1988.

While attending Texas, she continued to represent the United States in international competition.  She won a gold medal in the 4×100-meter freestyle relay at 1987 Pan American Games in Indianapolis, Indiana, and another gold as a member of the winning U.S. team in the 4×100-meter freestyle relay at the 1989 Pan Pacific Swimming Championships in Tokyo.

Steinseifer was inducted into the International Swimming Hall of Fame as an "Honor Swimmer" in 1999.

She lives outside Portland, Oregon, with her two daughters, Gabby and Miya, and her husband, Ken Blanco.

See also
 List of members of the International Swimming Hall of Fame
 List of Olympic medalists in swimming (women)
 List of University of Texas at Austin alumni

References

External links

 

1968 births
Living people
American female freestyle swimmers
Olympic gold medalists for the United States in swimming
Pan American Games gold medalists for the United States
People from Redwood City, California
Sportspeople from California
Swimmers at the 1983 Pan American Games
Swimmers at the 1984 Summer Olympics
Swimmers at the 1987 Pan American Games
Texas Longhorns women's swimmers
Medalists at the 1984 Summer Olympics
Swimmers from Oregon
Pan American Games medalists in swimming
Medalists at the 1983 Pan American Games
Medalists at the 1987 Pan American Games